"Shallow Be Thy Game" is a song by Red Hot Chili Peppers and was the fourth single from their 1995 album, One Hot Minute. The single was released in Australia only. It was also the only single from the album not to have a music video made for it.

The song is quite polemic in its direct assault on fundamentalist religion, which the lyrics openly mock.

Live performances 
Despite being a single, the song was performed very rarely on the One Hot Minute tour and has not been performed since 1996 and never in the United States.

Track listing
CD single (1996)
 "Shallow Be Thy Game" (album)
 "Walkabout" (album)
 "Suck My Kiss" (live)

Charts

References

1996 singles
Red Hot Chili Peppers songs
Song recordings produced by Rick Rubin
Songs critical of religion
Songs written by Flea (musician)
Songs written by Anthony Kiedis
Songs written by Chad Smith
Songs written by Dave Navarro
Warner Records singles
Funk metal songs
Alternative metal songs